Chernomorets Stadium is a multi-use stadium in Byala, Varna Province, Bulgaria.  It is used mostly for football matches and is the home field of FC Chernomorets Byala. The stadium has seating capacity for 700 people.

External links 
 Chernomorets Stadium at bgclubs.eu

Football venues in Bulgaria
Buildings and structures in Varna Province